Barcelos Municipality may refer to:
 Barcelos, Amazonas, Brazil
 Barcelos Municipality, Portugal

Municipality name disambiguation pages